22nd Century Media  was an American media company based in the suburbs of Chicago. The company was founded in 2005 and at one time published 14 weekly community newspapers. The publications had roughly 160,000 subscribers.

It ceased operations April 7, 2020, citing "the economic impact of the coronavirus on all small businesses, from which we earn a large majority of our advertising base."

Online 

In addition to the print content, each paper posted interactive videos, photo galleries, and a calendar online.

Newspapers
The Lake Forest Leader
The Glencoe Anchor
The Highland Park Landmark
The Northbrook Tower
The Wilmette Beacon
The Winnetka Current
The Glenview Lantern
The Homer Horizon
The Lockport Legend
The Mokena Messenger
The New Lenox Patriot
The Orland Park Prairie
The Tinley Junction
The Frankfort Station

Magazine
Chicagoly

References

External links
 Official website

Mass media companies of the United States
2005 establishments in Illinois
2020 disestablishments in Illinois
Mass media companies established in 2005
Mass media companies disestablished in 2020
Newspapers published in Illinois